Gwalleuk was a Korean Buddhist monk from the kingdom of Baekje who lived during the time of King Wideok. In 602, he travelled to Japan and is known for helping to spread the teachings of Taoism and Buddhism to Japan.  In particular, he brought over fangshu texts related to the likes of geomancy and onmyōdō (yinyang-based sorcery and divination), as well as a calendar, according to the Nihon Shoki. In 624, he was made a high priest (僧正 sōjō), possibly of Gangō-ji, for the rest of his life.

He is mentioned several times in Buddhist records in Japan, where he was known as Kanroku, the Japanese reading of his name.

Asteroid 
The asteroid 4963 Kanroku discovered on 18 February 1977 by Hiroki Kosai and Kiichirō Furukawa of the Tokyo Astronomical Observatory was named after him.

References

See also
List of Baekje-related topics
Korean Buddhism
Three Kingdoms of Korea

Baekje people
6th-century births
Baekje Buddhist monks
Asuka period Buddhist clergy
Korean Buddhist missionaries
7th-century deaths
Onmyōdō